Vadakadu is one of the largest villages in Alangudi, Tamil Nadu, India.

Mariamman Temple is a Hindu temple in the village. The temple's annual festival falls in May as well as Sithirai.

People are mostly engaged in agriculture.

Geography
Vadakadu is located at 
This town lies near Alangudi, a town in Pudukkottai district, Tamil Nadu, India.
This area mostly consists of red soil.

Demographics
Nearby villages are Pullanviduthi, Avanam

Protest
This is a place where the protests intensified for the hydrocarbon fracking to mine gas decision from the central government of India where people of Neduvasal are agitating against decision of the Government as it can pollute water and land here used for agriculture.

Etymology

Economy
This area is mainly depends on agriculture.
It's  plux board are quality and high quality vinyl banners.

Tourism
Sri muthumariyamman kovil

Schools
Thangam matriculation school, Vadakadu
Lions matriculation school, Mangadu
Government hr. sec school, Vadakadu
 1 government middle school and 5 primary school among different streets
ThaiTamil school, Vadakadu
Mercy School, Vadakadu

Banks
UCO Bank
PCC Bank

Nearest villages
Keeramangalam
Mangadu
Avanam
Kothamangalam
Pullanviduthi

Entertainment
Kabbadi, frequently arranged kabbadi matches.
cricket, cricket matches held annually from April to June.
volleyball, so many volleyball Player around this area.state level Matches held here.

Notable people
A.Venkatachalam, [1984, 1996 and 2001], during this time, he was also the Minister for Tourism in Chief Minister J. Jayalalitha's cabinet.
T. Pushparaju, Indian National Congress candidate from Alangudi constituency in 1977 election and from Thirumayam constituency in 1984 election. District President Thirumayam constituency Pudukkottai Congress Committee in 15 year continue.

References

Villages in Pudukkottai district

new:अलंगुडी